The Hampton River is a tidal inlet in the towns of Hampton and Hampton Falls, New Hampshire, the United States.

The river is formed by the confluence of the Taylor and Hampton Falls rivers. The Hampton River flows for one mile (1.6 km) before broadening into Hampton Harbor, an estuary which also receives flow from small tidal channels such as the Browns River and the Blackwater River. Hampton Harbor exits to the Atlantic Ocean through the Hampton Harbor Inlet, a dredged channel between Hampton Beach and Seabrook which is spanned by the Hampton Bridge.

See also

List of rivers of New Hampshire
New Hampshire Historical Marker No. 120: Bound Rock

References

Rivers of New Hampshire
Rivers of Rockingham County, New Hampshire